The Snellius class was a ship class of two hydrographic survey vessels that were built in the Netherlands for the Royal Netherlands Navy. They were specially designed to be able to conduct surveys under tropical conditions.

Design and construction
The two hydrographic survey vessels of the Snellius class were built at different shipyards in the Netherlands.

Both ships of the Snellius class were equipped with a single 40 mm gun, two 20 mm guns, two depth charge throwers and a single mousetrap.

For surveying the ships were equipped with several systems. Furthermore, a Decca positioning system was installed.

Service history
Between 1952 and 1962 the vessels of the Snellius class mostly performed surveys in Dutch New Guinea. However, during the heightened tensions in 1962 they were also used as patrol ships in Dutch New Guinea. At the end of 1962 Snellius and Luymes left Dutch New Guinea. 

Between 1965 and 1969 the survey vessels were active in Suriname and mapped the whole Surinamese continental plate and all the estuaries.

Between 1970 and 1973 Snellius and Luymes alternately participated in a international oceanographic survey that was conducted in the Caribbean Sea, the Gulf of Mexico and the waters between the northern part of South America and the estuary of the Amazon River.

In the 1970s both ships were deemed obsolete and in need of replacement. As a result Luymes was decommissioned in 1973, while Snellius was decommissioned in 1977 after having served as lodging ship between 1973 and 1976.

Ships in class

Notes

Citations

References

 

Survey vessels of the Royal Netherlands Navy